is an onsen, or hot springs in Kita-ku, Kobe, Japan. This Onsen is still a hidden treasure of modern Kobe, behind Mount Rokkō. It attracts many Japanese who want tranquility with beautiful natural surroundings and yet easy access from the busy cities in the Kansai metropolitan area including Osaka. Arima Onsen was named in "The Pillow Book", a famous Heian Era book, as one of the three famous springs in Japan. It was selected as the most prestigious hot spring during the Edo Era.

History

This onsen is the one of Japan's oldest, with Dōgo Onsen in Ehime Prefecture and Shirahama Onsen in Wakayama Prefecture. Many documents since the 8th century AD mention this onsen.

According to these documents, among the many visitors to Arima Onsen are Gyoki (行基), a charismatic Buddhist monk in the 7th century, and Ninsai (仁西), another monk in the 12th century. Ninsai was said to greatly admire Arima Onsen and helped develop it. Hideyoshi Toyotomi visited this onsen several times in the 16th century.

Springs

Arima Onsen has two kinds of springs.

Accommodation

In 2007, there were more than 20 hotels and inns in the Arima Onsen area, with Arima Grand Hotel being one of the largest in the area.

Gallery

See also
 Tosen Goshobo an historic ryokan (Japanese inn) located in Arima Onsen
Three Ancient Springs

References

External links

  Arima Onsen Sightseeing Association
  Arima Onsen Sightseeing Association
 

Hot springs of Hyōgo Prefecture
Tourist attractions in Kobe
Spa towns in Japan
Landforms of Hyōgo Prefecture